Crete Naval Base (Nafstathmos Kritis) is a major naval base of the Hellenic Navy and NATO at Souda Bay in Crete, Greece.

Formally known in NATO as Naval Support Activity, Souda Bay (NSA-Souda Bay), and more commonly in Greece as the Souda Naval Base (Naftiki Vasi Soudas), it serves as the second largest (in numbers of warships harboured) naval base of the Hellenic Navy and the largest and most prominent naval base for NATO in the eastern Mediterranean Sea. Additionally, it features the only deep water port in Southern Europe and the Mediterranean Sea that is suitable and capable of maintaining the largest aircraft carriers (class "supercarriers"). The only other such options available for the US Navy are Norfolk Naval Station and the Puget Sound Naval Shipyard in the United States and Dubai in the Persian Gulf.

History
Souda is a naturally protected harbor on the northwest coast of the island of Crete, founded for the first time during the Ottoman period, in 1872.

During World War II and the Battle of Greece, the harbor was the target of an Italian raid against the Allied navy as part of the Mediterranean Campaign.

After the war, the naval base was founded, around the same period with Greece's entry into the North Atlantic Alliance.

Facilities
The facilities include a dry dock, workshops, a fuel depot and an ammunition depot. The Naval Station is commanded by a Commodore or Captain of the Hellenic Navy. The Forward Logistics Site Souda Bay (FLS Souda Bay) was under the operational control of NATO's Allied Naval Forces Southern Europe (COMNAVSOUTH), until 2013. Since then, it is under the control of the Allied Maritime Command (MARCOM) which replaced NAVSOUTH. The Hellenic Navy radio communications station SXH has also been located at Mournies, near Souda, since 1929. The Κ-14, a deep-water quay, is the only of its kind in the Mediterranean Sea that allows the aircraft carriers to dock.

Since 2007, the Souda Bay Naval Base is host of the NATO Maritime Interdiction Operational Training Centre (ΝMIOTC), which is located at the Northern Sector of the base (Marathi).

Based units
Since 2020, the USS Hershel "Woody" Williams, a  expeditionary mobile base, in service with the United States Navy, is deployed to Crete Naval Base.

Gallery

See also
 List of United States Navy installations
 Greece-United States relations

References

External links

 NATO Maritime Interdiction Operational Training Centre
 U.S. Naval Support Activity Souda Bay Official's photostream

Hellenic Navy bases
NATO installations in Greece
Souda Bay
Greece–United States relations
Military installations of the United States in Greece
Buildings and structures in Chania (regional unit)